Rita Gemma Craven (née Gabriel; born 1 June 1950) is an Irish actress.
She is best known for her role as Joan Parker, the frigid wife of Arthur (Bob Hoskins), in the BBC TV drama Pennies From Heaven (1978).

Biography
Craven's family moved from Dublin to Britain in 1960, and she attended the same school as Helen Mirren, St Bernard's Convent High School for Girls in Westcliff-on-Sea in Essex.

She appeared as Cinderella in the film The Slipper and the Rose (1976) opposite Richard Chamberlain. She was cast as an unknown, having been spotted by one of the producers while performing at the Bristol Old Vic in a production of The Threepenny Opera. The local press touted the event as her own "Cinderella" story.

In London's West End, she starred opposite Tom Conti in the musical They're Playing Our Song for which she won a Laurence Olivier Award for her performance, the lead role in South Pacific, and in Noël Coward's Private Lives opposite Marc Sinden, Tony Anholt and Anholt's wife Tracey Childs which toured throughout 1991 and into 1992. She also played Josie in Boy George's Taboo and features on the OCR singing "Independent Woman".

She appeared as Joan Parker, the frigid wife of Arthur (Bob Hoskins), in the original television version of Dennis Potter's Pennies From Heaven (1978); she has since talked about the difficulty the role presented in undertaking a nude scene, which was seen as counter to her public image. She also made guest appearances on Robin of Sherwood (1985), The Bill, The Morecambe and Wise Show, The Two Ronnies, Father Ted (episode "And God Created Woman") and in the popular British drama Midsomer Murders episode, "Shot at Dawn" as Judy Hicks, the wife of Dave Hicks (Brian Capron). She co-starred in the acclaimed 1982 British TV version of East Lynne.  On the same Victorian theme she also appeared on BBC TV's long running old time music hall show The Good Old Days.

Her most substantial film role was as Minna Wagner opposite Richard Burton's Richard Wagner, in the 1983 film Wagner. She also appeared in Why Not Stay for Breakfast? (1979), Double X: The Name of the Game (1992), The Mystery of Edwin Drood (1993), Words Upon the Window Pane (1994) and The Hole (2001).

On radio, she played the part of Helen in the BBC Radio 4 comedy Clare in the Community.

She appeared on Irish television in the popular medical drama series The Clinic which runs weekly on RTÉ One.

In November/December 2008, Craven appeared in Hollyoaks Later as Erin "Ma" Fisher – Mother to Malachy, Kris and Bernadette.

Personal life
Craven was married from 1981 to 1984 to actor Frazer Hines, and from 1990 to 1996 to financier David Beamish.

References

External links

1950 births
Irish film actresses
Irish stage actresses
Irish television actresses
Living people
Laurence Olivier Award winners
Actresses from Dublin (city)
Singers from Dublin (city)
People from Blackpool
Irish radio actresses
20th-century Irish actresses
21st-century Irish actresses
20th-century Irish women singers
21st-century Irish women singers
People from Crumlin, Dublin